The United States competed at the 1983 World Championships in Athletics in Helsinki, Finland, from August 7 to 14, 1983. The championships were the first to feature both men and women's events and a full complement of events. The USA entered sixty-six men and thirty five women. The USA took home eight gold, nine silver and seven bronze medals. Ranking second in the medal table.

Medalists 
The following competitors from the United States won medals at the Championships

Men
Track and road events

* – Indicates the athlete competed in preliminaries but not the final

Field events

Combined events – Decathlon

Women
Track and road events

Field events

Combined events – Heptathlon

References

Nations at the 1983 World Championships in Athletics
World Championships in Athletics
1983